Monday Monday is an ITV, UTV comedy drama.

Monday Monday may also refer to:

 Monday, Monday (album), by Paul Horn
 "Monday, Monday", by The Mamas & The Papas

See also 
 Monday (disambiguation)